The  Battle of Sakhar kherda took place on 11 October 1724 at Sakhar Kherda (Sakhar Kherda or Sakhar Kherda) in Berar, 80 miles from Aurangabad between Nizam-ul-Mulk and Mubariz Khan, Subedar of Deccan.

Prelude
In 1714, Mughal emperor Farrukhsiyar appointed Nizam-ul-Mulk (also known as Nizam, Nizam I, and Asaf Jah I) as Viceroy of the Deccan. Deccan consisted of six Mughal governorates (Subah): Khandesh, Bijapur, Berar, Aurangabad, Hyderabad, Bidar, and Carnatic region was sub-Subah administered partly by governor of Bijapur and Hyderabad. In 1721, Nizam was commissioned to Delhi and became Prime Minister of the Mughal Empire. His differences with the court nobles led him to resign from all the imperial responsibilities in 1723 and leave for Deccan.

Under the influence of Nizam's opponents, Mughal Emperor Muhammad Shah issued a decree to Mubariz Khan, the governor of Hyderabad, to prevent the Nizam from taking the Deccan province under his control. Nizam and Mubariz Khan confronted each other at Shaker Kheda (a valley in present-day Buldhana district, Berar Subah,  from Aurangabad), resulting in the Battle of Shakar Kheda.

Events 
Mubariz Khan marched from Hyderabad against Nizam-ul-Mulk who was ready to meet the challenge. Both fought for some time and at last at Sakhar Kherda. In this decisive battle against great odds, Nizam-ul-Mulk, Asaf Jah I defeated and killed Mubariz Khan. After the victory of Nizam, officers and soldiers who took part in the battle were rewarded with cash and titles.

Aftermath 
In the next year, Emperor Muhammad Shah Rangeela conferred the title of Asaf Jah to Nizam-ul-Mulk and reappointed him as Subedar of the Deccan province on 25 June 1725.

References

External links
 hyderabad history

Shakar Kheda
1724 in India
Hyderabad State